Thomas Sherman (1 December 1825 – 10 October 1911) was an English professional first-class cricketer, active 1846–70, who played mainly for Surrey. Born in Mitcham, he was the son of James Sherman and nephew of John Sherman; he died in Croydon. A right-handed batsman and a right-arm fast roundarm bowler, Sherman made 82 known appearances in first-class matches.

References

1825 births
1911 deaths
All-England Eleven cricketers
English cricketers of 1826 to 1863
English cricketers of 1864 to 1889
English cricketers
Fast v Slow cricketers
Manchester Cricket Club cricketers
Marylebone Cricket Club cricketers
Non-international England cricketers
North v South cricketers
Surrey Club cricketers
Surrey cricketers
United All-England Eleven cricketers